

Linear record

Note: this list includes international friendlies.

Individual records

Note: this list includes international friendlies.

References

Iceland
 
Association football player non-biographical articles